The Syria missile strikes of February 2021 were a military operation allegedly launched by the Israeli Air Force against Hezbollah in Quneitra Governorate, Syria. Israeli media cited reports that the airstrikes could have caused casualties. The strikes also targeted sites near Damascus International Airport.

See also
 Syria missile strikes (January 2021)

References

2021 in the Syrian civil war
February 2021 events in Syria
2021 in Israel
2021 airstrikes
Airstrikes conducted by Israel
Airstrikes during the Syrian civil war
Attacks on buildings and structures in Syria
Military operations of the Syrian civil war in 2021
Quneitra Governorate in the Syrian civil war
Iran–Israel conflict during the Syrian civil war
Israeli involvement in the Syrian civil war